David Davies (1820 – June 1930) was Archdeacon of Llandaff from his appointment in 1924  until his death.

Born in Carmarthenshire, he was educated at  Llandovery College, Shrewsbury School and Jesus College, Oxford and ordained in 1882. After curacies in Conwy and Cardiff he held incumbencies in Newcastle, Bridgend, Canton, Cardiff and Dinas Powis. He was Surroage for the Diocese of Llandaff from 1907; and a Canon Residentiary at its Cathedral from 1914.

References

1858 births
1930 deaths
People from Carmarthenshire
People educated at Llandovery College
People educated at Shrewsbury School
Alumni of Jesus College, Oxford
Archdeacons of Llandaff